

Round and draw dates
Source

Group stage

Source

Group 1

Group 2

Group 3

Group 4

Group 5

Group 6

Knockout stage

Quarter-finals

Semi-finals

First leg

Second leg

Final

See also
 Welsh League Cup
 Welsh Premier League
 Welsh Cup

References

External links
Official League Cup Website
 Welsh-Premier.com Loosemores League Cup
Loosemores Solicitors Official Website

 
Welsh League Cup seasons
League Cup